Cwrt Herbert, also sometimes called Court Herbert, is a small community to the east of Neath Abbey in south Wales
It developed  as a mining village servicing the Cwrt Herbert Colliery in the mid 19th century The colliery closed in 1929 and the village is now predominantly a dormitory for the town of Neath.

A Roman fort named Nidum was found in the village, and is now mostly within the ground of Dwr-y-Felin Comprehensive School.

References

Neath
Mining communities in Wales